The International University of Novi Pazar is a Serbian private university which was founded in 2002 with support of then Prime Minister of Serbia Zoran Đinđić. Upon their request a Muslim minority from Sandžak area was given the right to found their own university. This institution is a Waqf (often translated in English with Foundation), which is legally something between publicly owned and privately owned university.

History

The University was established in 2002 with support of then Prime Minister of Serbia Zoran Đinđić. For his support in establishing the university, every year a special ceremony called class of appreciation is held in amphitheater of International University of Novi Pazar.

As of 2018, International University of Novi Pazar is the only registered university in Serbia that has not received the accreditation by accreditation regulatory body. As of 2018–19 school year, together with the State University of Novi Pazar, there are 2,250 students in Novi Pazar.

See also
 Education in Serbia
 List of universities in Serbia
 State University of Novi Pazar

References

External links

 

International University of Novi Pazar
Journalism schools in Europe
Educational institutions established in 2002
International University
2002 establishments in Serbia
Education in Novi Pazar